East Twin Falls is located about 15 miles west of Joyce, Washington.  The falls are within the Olympic National Forest.  The falls are located directly off of East Twin Road which is accessible from State Route 112.  The Falls are approximately 40 feet in height.

Waterfalls of Washington (state)
Landforms of Clallam County, Washington
Horsetail waterfalls